The Grob G 110 was a single-engined two-seat light aircraft, made mainly of glassfibre, which was designed and built by the German manufacturer Grob Aircraft in the early 1980s. Two prototypes were built, with the first example making its maiden flight on 6 February 1982, but development was abandoned after the first prototype crashed later that year.

Design and development
In 1972, the German machine tool manufacturer, Burkhardt Grob Untermehnensbereich Maschinenbau, set up a subsidiary, Grob Flugzeugbau, to build aircraft. Grob Flugzeugbau started by building Schempp-Hirth Standard Cirrus gliders under license before switching to its own designs of gliders and motor gliders. In 1982 Grob revealed a more conventional powered light aircraft, the Grob G 110. This was a two-seat low-wing monoplane suitable for use as a training aircraft for flying clubs. Pilot and passenger sat side by side in an enclosed cabin. Grob had considerable experience in composite aircraft construction from its years of using glassfibre in its Gliders, and the G 110 was largely built of glassfibre. The wings used an airfoil section designed to give laminar flow, in order to improve performance.

Two prototypes were built, with the first making its maiden flight on 6 February 1982. This aircraft crashed in August 1982 while testing the aircraft's spinning characteristics, when it could not be recovered from a flat spin, the test pilot escaping by parachute. Although testing continued with the second prototype, the type was abandoned without entering production with Grob designing a new two seat trainer, the Grob G 112. This too was a failure, as it was overweight, but the companies third attempt to enter the trainer market, the Grob G 115, flew in 1985.

Variants
G 1102-seat sporting aircraft
G 111Proposed 4-seat development of the G110

Specifications

References

1980s German civil trainer aircraft
Grob aircraft
Single-engined tractor aircraft
Low-wing aircraft
Aircraft first flown in 1982